Ruke Orhorhoro (born October 13, 2001) is an American football defensive tackle. He played college football at Clemson.

Early years
Orhorhoro was born in Nigeria and moved to the United States when he was nine. He attended River Rouge High School in River Rouge, Michigan. He played basketball a majority of his high school career and did not start playing football until his junior year in 2017. Orhorhoro committed to Clemson University to play college football.

College career
As a true freshman at Clemson in 2019, Ororhoro played in nine games and had five tackles and 0.5 sacks. In 2020, he played in four games and took a medical redshirt. He started nine of 13 games in 2021, recording 36 tackles and 2.5 sacks. Orkorhoro returned to Clemson for his senior year in 2022.

References

External links
Clemson Tigers bio

2001 births
Living people
Nigerian players of American football
Players of American football from Michigan
American football defensive tackles
Clemson Tigers football players